HeroQuest is an adventure board game by Milton Bradley and Games Workshop.

HeroQuest or Hero's Quest may also refer to:
 HeroQuest (video game), a computer game adaptation of the board game
 HeroQuest (role-playing game), formerly Hero Wars, rebranded Questworlds in 2020.
 Hero's Quest or  Quest for Glory, a computer game series

See also
 Advanced HeroQuest, a Games Workshop-produced sequel to the board game
 HeroQuest II: Legacy of Sorasil, a sequel to the first computer game